Justin Levinson is a singer/songwriter from Vermont.

Music career

The son of singer/songwriter Bob Levinson, Justin Levinson grew up in Vergennes, VT. In high school, he was introduced to Lester Bowie and Fontella Bass, who were traveling on a grant to bring jazz to rural areas. He attended Berklee College of Music in Boston, accepted in part due to a letter of recommendation from Bowie. He started out studying jazz trumpet, before switching to and getting his degree in songwriting.

On his earlier releases, Levinson's sound has drawn many comparisons to Ben Folds.

1175 Boylston

Levinson released his first album, 1175 Boylston, in 2006, while a student at Berklee. On the album (which was named after Levinson's address at the time), he supplied the vocals and played piano, trumpet and trombone while his father played guitar, bass and drums on some tracks, with fellow Berklee student Adam Popick supplying the remaining instruments. The single "City With Two Streetlights" spent eight weeks on the CMJ Top 25 charts. Faculty members of the Berklee songwriting department also voted the album's opening track “Sunny Day” the best song of the year. Following the album's release, Levinson played the 2006 International Pop Overthrow Festival, and was named Best Male Artist at The 4th Annual IAMA (International Acoustic Music Awards).

Bury Your Love

In 2007, Levinson, by then a graduate of Berklee, released his second album, Bury Your Love. Many reviews of this record noted the influence of Elton John. The same year, he won the ASCAPLUS award and was a finalist in the USA Songwriting Competition.

Predetermined Fate

Levinson's 2009 release, Predetermined Fate, had a more country-influenced style. One single on the album, "Waiting For Someone To Love Me", was played heavily on Sirius, and he was nominated for the Sirius singer-songwriter discovery of the year. Another track, “Losing You To Tennessee”, was featured on Virgin Airlines flights.

This Side of Me, This Side of You

In 2012, Levinson released This Side of Me, This Side of You, his first album with his band, The Valcours. The band is made up of Sean Witters on guitar, Seth Barbiero on bass, Josh Glass on organ and synthesizer, and Simon Plumpton on drums and sampler, with Levinson writing the songs, and the group writing the arrangements. Levinson plays piano and provides vocals. The album included a number of guest contributions as well. Boston-based recording artist Will Dailey appeared on the track "Let You Go", Burlington singer/songwriter Gregory Douglass contributed to "Love You Goodbye", and Liz Longley was on "I Was So Wrong."

Take My Time

In 2013, Levinson released the three-song EP Take My Time. Noted in reviews as a slight departure from his work with the Valcours, the EP took a more country-influenced turn on the third and final track, “Bid The Rest Goodbye”, which employs steel guitars and fiddles.

Yes Man

Early 2017, Justin Levinson released his fifth studio album Yes Man. The album was produced by Adam Popick. After touring California, he was invited by Songs & Whispers, a European booking agency, to tour Germany, the Netherlands, and Belgium.

During 2018, Justin Levinson collaborated with Anna Nalick on a new single titled A Part of Me.

Live performances

Levinson has played live in support of Apollo Sunshine, Serena Ryder, The Verve Pipe, Big Head Todd and the Monsters, Matt Wertz, Chris Barron of the Spin Doctors, Grand Archives and Zox. He toured with One Tree Hill star and singer-songwriter Tyler Hilton. He has toured with Aaron Carter, opening on select dates of the After Party Tour, as well as with Teddy Geiger and Howie Day. He has appeared at NXNE and the Boston International Pop Overthrow. He has also made television performances, including on Bangor's WLBZ, Connecticut's WTNH, Backstage With Barry Nolan (Comcast), The 10 Show! (NBC Philadelphia), NECN Morning News, Fox 44 Boston, Plum TV on Martha’s Vineyard and Late Night Saturday WCAX Burlington, Vermont.

Film industry
Levinson wrote and performed a song for the 2013 film The Den, entitled "Love You Goodbye".

Work with Champlain Community Services

Levinson works for Champlain Community Services, an organization dedicated to help provide services and self-advocacy to developmentally disabled adults. He facilitates a show called The Advocacy Team, which airs on Vermont Community Access Media. The show features clients of Champlain Community Services interviewing local celebrities.

Discography

References

External links
Official Site

Living people
American singer-songwriters
Musicians from Vermont
American male singer-songwriters
1985 births
21st-century American singers
21st-century American male singers
Berklee College of Music alumni